Wilfred Pence Dacus (July 26, 1931 – February 15, 2019) was an American football player and coach. He served as the head football coach at Pepperdine University from 1960 to 1961, compiling a record of 2–18. He began his collegiate playing career at Tarleton State University, where he was a quarterback. Dacus moved on to Southwest Texas State University in San Marcos, Texas, where he lettered in both football and basketball. He was selected by the Detroit Lions in the 1954 NFL Draft.

Dacus was born on July 26, 1931, in San Saba, Texas.  He grew up in San Saba and Brady, Texas.  Dacus attended Abilene Christian College—now known as Abilene Christian University—and earned a doctorate degree at the University of Houston.

Head coaching record

References

1931 births
2019 deaths
American football quarterbacks
Pepperdine Waves football coaches
Tarleton State Texans football players
Texas State Bobcats football players
Texas State Bobcats men's basketball players
Abilene Christian University alumni
University of Houston alumni
People from Brady, Texas
People from San Saba, Texas
Players of American football from Texas
Basketball players from Texas